Garnock may refer to:
The River Garnock in North Ayrshire, Scotland
Glengarnock, a small village on the river, once the site of Glengarnock Steelworks.
Garnock Valley area of North Ayrshire, which takes in the towns of Beith, Dalry and Kilbirnie.
Garnock Academy in Kilbirnie, a secondary school formed in 1971.
Garnock RFC, a rugby club located at Lochshore, Glengarnock.
Garnock Way soap opera, produced by Scottish Television from 1976 to 1979.
Robert Garnock (1660–1681), Scottish covenanter